It Shouldn't Happen to a Dog is a 1946 American comedy crime film starring Carole Landis, Allyn Joslyn and Margo Woode, and directed by Herbert I. Leeds.

Synopsis
After returning from World War II, a journalist is assigned by his newspaper to be science editor when he wishes to be restored to his old job as a crime reporter. While drowning his sorrows in a bar, he sees what he believes to be a hold-up involving a beautiful young woman and her dog. He triggers a major manhunt after calling in the story to his newsdesk, before realizing that the woman is both innocent and a serving member of the police. Together with her - who is assigned to the same case he is working on - they are  able to bring the Valentine gang of criminals to justice.

Partial cast
 Carole Landis as Julia Andrews 
 Allyn Joslyn as Henry Barton 
 Margo Woode as Olive Stone 
 Harry Morgan as Gus Rivers 
 Reed Hadley as Mike Valentine 
 Jean Wallace as Bess Williams 
 Roy Roberts as 'Mitch' Mitchell 
 John Ireland as Benny Smith 
 John Alexander as Joe Parelli
 Whit Bissell as Chester Frye

References

Bibliography
 Fleming, E.J. Carole Landis: A Tragic Life in Hollywood. McFarland, 2005.

External links

1946 films
American crime comedy films
1940s crime comedy films
Films directed by Herbert I. Leeds
Films scored by David Buttolph
20th Century Fox films
American black-and-white films
1946 comedy films
1940s English-language films
1940s American films